Verdun is an unincorporated community in Livingston Parish, Louisiana, United States. Also, Verdun is the true hometown of the 2019 American Idol Winner Laine Hardy.

References

Unincorporated communities in Livingston Parish, Louisiana
Unincorporated communities in Louisiana